Washington Wolves is a 1999 Spanish thriller film directed by Mariano Barroso and written by Juan Cavestany which stars Javier Bardem, Eduard Fernández, Ernesto Alterio, Alberto San Juan and José Sancho.

Plot
Miguel and Alberto want to scam their old boss 20 million pesetas with a disorganized plan along with several other people such as the mistress of their boss's wife. One of their partners, Claudio has managed to have a comfortable life while Miguel and Alberto they have been mistreated by life leading a life of misery. A mixture of despair and need will make them skin like wounded wolves in the night.

Cast

Production 
Washington Wolves was produced by Aurum Producciones and Sogetel, in association with Pinguin Films, with collaboration of Canal+ and participation of Antena 3.

Reception 
Jonathan Holland of Variety deemed the film (a thriller "worthy of mention") to be a "a stylish, superbly played and well-written piece about luckless criminals", "let down only by some sloppy plotting and a couple of characters too many".

Accolades 

|-
| align = "center" | 2000 || 14th Goya Awards || Best New Actor || Eduard Fernández ||  || align = "center" | 
|}

See also 
 List of Spanish films of 1999

References

External links
 
 Rotten Tomatoes

1999 thriller films
Spanish thriller films
1990s Spanish-language films
1990s Spanish films